The Academy of Management Journal (AMJ) a is peer-reviewed academic journal covering all aspects of management. It is published by the Academy of Management and was established in 1958 as the Journal of the Academy of Management, obtaining its current name in 1963. 

According to the Journal Citation Reports, the journal has a 2021 impact factor of 10.979. In 2012 the journal was listed as one of the top 10 offenders in a practice called "coercive citation", wherein publishers manipulate their impact factors to artificially boost their academic reputation.

It is also on the Financial Times list of 45 journals used to rank business schools and is one of the four general management journals that the University of Texas Dallas uses to rank the research productivity of universities.

References

External links 
 

Business and management journals
Bimonthly journals
Publications established in 1958
English-language journals